The Advisory Council for the National Transition (in Catalan: Consell Assessor per a la Transició Nacional) is a body created by the Government of Catalonia in 2013 to advise the government on the national transition of Catalonia and achieving Catalan self-determination referendum. The main task of this body is to analyze the different factors to consider in the process of transition to an independent Catalonia.

The CATN made a total of 18 reports which were published individually and jointly in the White Paper on the National Transition of Catalonia.

Reports 
 The consultation on the political future of Catalonia 
 Internationalization of the poll and the self-determination process of Catalonia 
 Paths for Catalonia’s integration in the European Union 
 Integration in the International Community 
 The fiscal and financial viability of an independent Catalonia

References

External links

Consell Assessor per a la Transició Nacional

Government of Catalonia
Politics of Catalonia